M181 or M-181 may refer to:

M181 motorway, a motorway in England
M-181 (Michigan highway), a former state highway in Michigan